Roberson de Arruda Alves (born 2 April 1989), simply known as Roberson, is a Brazilian professional footballer who plays as a forward.

Honours
Red Bull Bragantino
Campeonato Brasileiro Série B: 2019

Atlético Goianiense
Campeonato Goiano: 2020

References

External links

1989 births
Living people
People from Campo Grande
Brazilian footballers
Brazilian expatriate footballers
Grêmio Foot-Ball Porto Alegrense players
Esporte Clube Juventude players
Sport Club do Recife players
Avaí FC players
Clube Náutico Capibaribe players
MC Alger players
Sport Club Internacional players
Jeju United FC players
Red Bull Brasil players
Red Bull Bragantino players
Cruzeiro Esporte Clube players
Atlético Clube Goianiense players
Campeonato Brasileiro Série A players
Campeonato Brasileiro Série B players
Campeonato Brasileiro Série C players
Algerian Ligue Professionnelle 1 players
K League 1 players
Association football forwards
Brazilian expatriate sportspeople in Algeria
Brazilian expatriate sportspeople in South Korea
Expatriate footballers in Algeria
Expatriate footballers in South Korea
Sportspeople from Mato Grosso do Sul